is one of the eight wards of Niigata City, Niigata Prefecture, in the Hokuriku region of  Japan. , the ward had an estimated population of 44,522 in 15,980 households and a population density of 440 persons per km2.

Geography
Minami-ku is located in an inland region of north-central Niigata Prefecture. The area is dominated by agriculture, notably rice production and horticulture.

Surrounding municipalities
Niigata Prefecture
Nishi-ku, Niigata
Nishikan-ku, Niigata
Kōnan-ku, Niigata
Akiha-ku, Niigata
 Kamo
 Sanjō
 Tsubame
 Tagami

History
The area of present-day Minami-ku was part of ancient Echigo Province. The modern town of Shirone and village of Ajikata were established on April 1, 1889 within Nakakanbara District with the establishment of the municipalities system. The village of Tsukigata was created on April 1, 1906 by the merger of three hamlets. Shirone was elevated to city status on June 1, 1959. The city of Niigata annexed Shirone, Ajikata and Tsukigata on March 21, 2005. Niigata became a government-designated city on April 1, 2007 and was divided into wards, with the new Minami Ward consisting of the former city of Shirone and former villages of Ajikata and Tsukigata.

Education
Minami-ku has 11 public elementary schools and six public middle schools operated by the Niigata city government. There is one public high school operated by the Niigata Prefectural Board of Education.

Transportation

Railways

Minami-ku is not served by any passenger rail service. A railway line operated by Niigata Kotsu ceased operations in 1999.
 Higashi-Sekiya—Shirone—Tsukigata: closed in 1999
 Tsukigata—: closed in 1993

Transit bus
 Transit bus operated by Niigata Kotsu
 W7 / W8

Highways

Local attractions

Places
 Niigata Agriculture Park

Event
 Shirone Giant Kite Battle

References

External links

 Niigata official website 
 Niigata Minami-ku website 
 Niigata City Official Tourist Information (multilingual)
 Niigata Pref. Official Travel Guide (multilingual)

Wards of Niigata (city)